The Aiways U6 is an all-electric battery-powered fastback Compact crossover SUV from Aiways.

The U6 will be the second all-electric model produced by Chinese start up, Aiways. It is based on the U6 ion concept first shown at the Chengdu Auto Show in China in July 2020, and went into pre-production at Aiways’ Shangrao plant in May 2021.

Production 
The U6 will be produced at Aiways’ Shangrao plant, China. The pre-production phase began in May 2021. Mass production for the Chinese market and delivery is planned in 2021. Production for European models will begin later in 2021, and market launch in Europe will be early 2022.

Aiways Thailand (Aiways and Phoenix EV joint venture) plans to produce Aiways U6 in Thailand by 2023.

Design

Styling 
The production version of Aiways U6 keeps the domed glass panoramic roof of the U6ion concept car. It is styled to be sportier in appearance than the other Aiways model, the U5. It is the second Aiways vehicle to be built on the company's More Adaptable Structure (MAS) platform and will offer features such as remote parking assist which allows the driver to use their smartphone to park the U6 from up to 10 meters away.

Warranty and maintenance 
New Aiways U6 is expected to be offered with the same warranty and maintenance experience as the U5 which comes with a five-year or 150,000 km manufacturer warranty.

Aftersales and servicing in Europe  is also expected to be provided by in-country partners.

References

Aiways
Production electric cars
Cars introduced in 2021